Arne Thomsen (born 1 March 1942) is a Danish gymnast. He competed in seven events at the 1968 Summer Olympics.

References

External links
 

1942 births
Living people
Danish male artistic gymnasts
Olympic gymnasts of Denmark
Gymnasts at the 1968 Summer Olympics
People from Esbjerg
Sportspeople from the Region of Southern Denmark